NGC 1859 is an open cluster in the constellation Dorado. It was discovered in 1834 by the British astronomer John Herschel with an 18.7-inch reflecting telescope.

References

1859
Dorado (constellation)
Open clusters